Alive... in Poland is a live album by the Italian thrash/black metal band Bulldozer released on 17 November 1990. It was recorded live in front of a capacity of 5,500 fans in Zabrze, Poland on 17 November 1989. There is also a bootleg CD version called Greetings from Poland which adds some extra studio tracks from the IX album.

Track listing

Digitally remastered using 24-bit process

Personnel
 A.C. Wild - Keyboards, Vocals, Bass
 Andy Panigada - Guitars
 Rob "Klister" Cabrini - Drums

Production
 Bratt Sinclaire - Producer

References

Bulldozer (band) albums
1990 live albums